Chrysotoxum cautum is a species of hoverfly. It is found in southern Britain and Europe East into the Palearctic but is normally encountered in small numbers. The larvae are thought to feed on root aphids. Adults are usually found on the edges of woodland or scrub or along hedgerows where they visit a wide range of flowers.

Identification
External images For terms see Morphology of Diptera
Wing length 10·25–13 mm.
Orange stigma.Apical antennomere as long as antennomeres 1 and 2 together. Abdomen relatively flat. The genitalia are exceptionally large and reach over the hind margin of sternite 4.

Keys and accounts 
Coe R.L. (1953) Syrphidae
Van Veen, M. (2004) Hoverflies of Northwest Europe
Van der Goot,V.S. (1981) De zweefvliegen van Noordwest - Europa en Europees Rusland, in het bijzonder van de Benelux
Bei-Bienko, G.Y. & Steyskal, G.C. (1988) Keys to USSR insects. Diptera

Distribution
Europe East across the Palearctic to Greece and Turkey and into Russia as far as the Altai mountains and Mongolia.

Biology
Habitat is deciduous forest and scrub, unimproved grassland and lightly grazed grassland, open areas in forest or scrub on well-drained sites. Flowers visited include white umbellifers; yellow composites, Allium ursinum, Caltha, Cornus, Crataegus, Euphorbia, Geranium, Plantago, Ranunculus, Rhamnus catharticus, Rubus and Sorbus aucuparia.
The flight period is  May to July (April in southern Europe).

References

External links
Biolib

Syrphinae
Diptera of Europe
Insects described in 1776
Taxa named by Moses Harris